Sasha Hutchings (born December 21, 1988) is an American actress, dancer, and singer. She is best known for her role as an understudy and ensemble member in the original Broadway cast of Hamilton.

Hutchings has also appeared in the Broadway productions of Oklahoma!, My Fair Lady, Motown: the Musical, Rocky, and Memphis.

Early life 
Sasha Hutchings was born on December 21, 1988 in Macon, Georgia. Her father, Dr. William Hutchings, is a doctor, and her mother is a news anchor and teacher. Her father is of African-American descent. Hutchings attended Central High School, graduating from its Fine Arts and International Baccalaureate program in 2007.

Hutchings started taking dance lessons at 3 years old, and in her senior year of high school, her dance studio director inspired her to pursue dance as a career. Hutchings attended Oklahoma City University, majoring in dance performance at the Ann Lacy School of Dance and graduating in 2011.

Career 
Hutchings performed in various regional productions at the Lyric Theatre of Oklahoma, including Buddy: The Buddy Holly Story, Oliver!, Hairspray, Ragtime, and A Chorus Line, where she played Diana Morales. Starting December 13, 2011, Hutchings made her Broadway debut as a swing in the musical Memphis at the Shubert Theatre, remaining with the show until it closed on August 5, 2012. From March 11 to December 22, 2013, Hutchings performed as a swing and originated the roles of Claudette Robinson, Billie Jean Brown, and Marvelette in the Broadway production of Motown: The Musical at the Lunt-Fontanne Theatre. She reprised her roles from September 30 to October 19, 2014. In 2013, Hutchings appeared as a dancer in five episodes in the second season of the NBC musical television series Smash. Hutchings was also in the ensemble and played Apollo Girl in the original cast of the Broadway production of Rocky at the Winter Garden Theatre from February 13 to August 17, 2014.

Hutchings performed as an ensemble member and understudy for Peggy Schuyler and Maria Reynolds in the original cast of Hamilton by Lin-Manuel Miranda. She performed during its Off-Broadway run at The Public Theater from January 20 to May 3, 2015, and starting July 13, 2015 she reprised her roles for the Broadway production at the Richard-Rogers Theatre, leaving the show on August 27, 2016. Hamilton received high critical acclaim, winning eleven Tony Awards, including Best Musical, and eight Drama Desk Awards.

In 2016, Hutchings guest-starred as Ariel Rice in one episode of the CBS series Blue Bloods. She also performed in the Off-Broadway revival of Sweet Charity as Rosie and as a member of the ensemble, alongside Sutton Foster. The New Group production was held at The Pershing Square Signature Center from November 2, 2016 to January 8, 2017. From September 27 to October 29, 2017, she played Kathy Selden in the ZACH Theatre production of Singin' in the Rain in Austin, Texas. In 2017, she made her film debut as a secretary in The Vanishing of Sidney Hall and made a guest appearance as Amelia in the Netflix comedy series Master of None. Starting March 15, 2018, Hutchings performed in the original ensemble cast of the 2018 Broadway revival of My Fair Lady, before departing on March 10, 2019. Also in 2018, she appeared as Kourtney, a back-up dancer, in one episode of Netflix's Marvel series Jessica Jones, as well as Annie Tran in one episode of the Amazon Prime Video series The Dangerous Book for Boys.

From March 19, 2019 to January 19, 2020, Hutchings understudied the roles of Ado Annie Carnes, Laurey Williams, and the lead dancer in the 2019 Broadway revival of the musical Oklahoma!. The revival won the Tony Award for Best Revival of a Musical in 2019. She has also made television guest appearances as a dancer in an episode of the FX miniseries Fosse/Verdon in 2019 and as Colleen in an episode of Freeform comedy series The Bold Type in 2020. On July 3, 2020, the film version of Hamilton was released to Disney+, featuring her performance in the ensemble.

Personal life 
Hutchings, along with other members of the Hamilton cast, helped organize the virtual fundraiser event Ham4Change in August 2020, raising over $1 million for charities supporting African Americans. Along with fellow cast member Jonathan Groff, Hutchings hosted a virtual fundraiser concert in support of the Democratic campaigns of Jon Ossoff and Raphael Warnock in the Georgia Senate Runoff elections that took place December 13, 2020. She is also a member of the Epic Theatre Ensemble's Artist Advisory Council, often holding dance workshops and master classes.

Starting October 2020, Hutchings and her Hamilton colleague Nik Walker together host their online talk show "The Chaos Twins" every other Wednesday.

Filmography

Stage

Film

Television

References

External links 
 
 Sasha Hutchings at Internet Broadway Database
 Sasha Hutchings at Internet Off-Broadway Database

American musical theatre actresses
American stage actresses
American female dancers
21st-century American actresses
American television actresses
Living people
1998 births
People from Macon, Georgia